Nizza may refer to:

Places 
 Nice, a city of the Côte d’Azur, known in Italian, German, and in certain other languages as 
 Nizza di Sicilia, in the Province of Messina, Sicily, Italy
 Nizza Monferrato, in the Province of Asti, Piedmont, Italy 
 Ponte Nizza, in the Province of Pavia, Lombardy, Italy
 Val di Nizza, in the Province of Pavia, Lombardy, Italy
 County of Nice, a historical region of France
 Nizza-Ufer, a park in Frankfurt am Main, Germany
 Nizza (Turin Metro), a station of the Turin Metro, Italy

Other uses
 Nizza DOCG, an Italian red Piemonte wine
 Amarilli Nizza (born 1971), Italian operatic soprano
 Rio Nizza, a stream which flows through Nizza Monferrato

See also
Nisa (disambiguation)
Nise (disambiguation)
Niza (disambiguation)
Nysa (disambiguation)
Nyssa (disambiguation)